Mainland Tactix are a New Zealand netball team based in Christchurch, Canterbury. Between 1998 and 2007, as Canterbury Flames, they played in the Coca-Cola Cup/National Bank Cup league. Between 2008 and 2016, they played in the ANZ Championship. Between 2008 and 2012 they were known as Canterbury Tactix. However, after Netball Mainland was established in October 2012, the team subsequently adopted their current name. Netball Mainland is the governing body that represents the South Island regions of Canterbury, West Coast, Nelson and Marlborough. Since 2017, Tactix have represented Netball Mainland in the ANZ Premiership. During the ANZ Championship era, Tactix won just 20 of their 114 games and never  featured in a finals series. However, during the ANZ Premiership era they emerged as challengers. They were grand finalists in both 2020 and 2021

History

Canterbury Flames

Between 1997 and 2007, Canterbury Flames, competed in the Coca-Cola Cup/National Bank Cup league. In 2008, when the National Bank Cup was replaced by the ANZ Championship, Canterbury Flames were rebranded as Canterbury Tactix.

ANZ Championship
Between 2008 and 2016, Tactix played in the ANZ Championship. Helen Mahon-Stroud became the first Tactix head caoch and Julie Seymour became their first captain. Netball Mainland was established in October 2012 and Canterbury Tactix subsequently became Mainland Tactix. During their nine seasons in the ANZ Championship, Tactix won just 20 of their 114 games, never winning more than five games in a season and never featuring in a finals series.

Regular season statistics

ANZ Premiership 
Since 2017, Tactix have played in the ANZ Premiership. They were runners up in the 2018 Netball New Zealand Super Club tournament. In 2020 and 2021, with a team coached by Marianna Delaney-Hoshek and captained by Jane Watson, Tactix played in two successive grand finals.

Regular season statistics

Grand finals
ANZ Premiership

Netball New Zealand Super Club

Home venues

Notable players

2023 squad

Internationals

 Charlotte Kight
 Jessica Moulds

 Kate Beveridge
 Demelza Fellowes
 Chelsea Pitman

 Kelera Nawai

 Victoria Smith

 Kasey Evering

 Mwai Kumwenda

 Julianna Naoupu

 Vika Koloto

Captains

Award winners

ANZ Championship awards
ANZ Championship Best New Talent

New Zealand Netball Awards
ANZ Premiership Player of the Year

Coaches

Head coaches

Assistant coaches

Main sponsors

Reserve team
Since 2016, Netball Mainland have entered a team in the National Netball League. They are effectively the reserve team of Mainland Tactix.

Honours

ANZ Premiership
Runners Up: 2020, 2021
Netball New Zealand Super Club
Runners Up: 2018

References

External links
 Official website
  Mainland Tactix on Facebook
  Mainland Tactix on Twitter

 
ANZ Premiership teams
ANZ Championship teams
Netball teams in New Zealand
Sports clubs established in 2007
2007 establishments in New Zealand
Sport in Christchurch